Herman Finer (February 24, 1898 in Hertsa, Kingdom of Romania – March 4, 1969 in Chicago, United States) was a Jewish Romanian-born British political scientist and Fabian socialist.

His parents were Max Finer (1866/67–1945) and his wife, Fanny Weiner (1872/73–1945). They had immigrated from Romania and earned a living first as market traders and, later, as owners of a drapery shop. He taught for many years at the University of Chicago. He was the eldest brother of Samuel Finer.

Literary works
 Foreign governments at work, 1921
 The case against proportional representation, 1924
 Theory and practice of modern government, 2 Vols., 1932
 Representative government and a parliament, 1933
 English local government, 1933 (2nd ed. 1945, 3rd 1946)
 Mussolini's Italy, 1935
 British civil service, 1937
 The Delimination of the Part played by and an Analysis of the Effects of the Sense of Responsibility in Social Life and in particular in the Economic Order. in: Le sens de la responsabilite dans la vie sociale. Other authors Hanna Meuter, Cologne & John Atkinson Hobson. Institut de sociologie Solvay, Parc Léopold. - Brussels (1938 or 1939), Series: Enquêtes Sociologiques, Vol. 2. Université Libre de Bruxelles. -Finer: p. 151 - 250 (engl.), ib. in French p. 251 - 338
 Municipal trading, 1941
 International T.V.A., 1944
 Road to reaction. 1945
 Future of government, 1946
 America's destiny, 1947
 The Theory and Practice of Modern Government, 1961 (4th ed. of the abridged one-volume 1950 edition of the two-volume work of 1932 'thoroughly rewritten as to be a new work', Preface [vi]), Methuen & Co. Ltd. London.

References

1898 births
1969 deaths
British political scientists
Members of the Fabian Society
University of Chicago faculty
People from Chernivtsi Oblast
20th-century political scientists